Marco Calderoni (born 18 February 1989) is an Italian footballer who plays as a left-back for Cesena.

Club career

Piacenza
Calderoni made his first team debut on 25 May 2008 against Cesena, the 2nd last match of the season.

In February 2010, Piacenza and Serie A outfit Palermo agreed for a loan exchange between Calderoni and Romanian full-back Cristian Melinte, with the former joining the rosanero with immediate effect.

He played his first game in a rosanero jersey, as well as his first Serie A game, as a starter in a 3–1 home win to Bologna. He returned at Piacenza at the end of the season, with only one appearance during his short stint with the Sicilian side. 
In January 2011 is made official his transfer on loan Ascoli.

Grosseto
In January 2012 Calderoni was signed by Grosseto.

Bari
On 14 August 2013, Calderoni was signed by Chievo. Half of the registration rights, valued for €90,000, was immediately swap to Bari, for the full registration rights of Claiton dos Santos, valued for undisclosed fee. Calderoni signed a 5-year contract with Bari. In March 2014, the liquidator of Bari also adjusted the valued of the 50% registration rights, to €126,700. However, in June 2015 Cheivo bought back Calderoni for a price below the valuation, for €80,000.

Chievo
Calderoni re-joined Chievo on 25 June 2015 for €80,000. On 13 July he was signed by U.S. Latina Calcio in a temporary deal.

Novara
On 4 July 2016 he moved on loan to Novara Calcio along with Tomasz Kupisz. On 1 July 2017 Calderoni joined Novara on a permanent basis and signed a three-year deal with his club.

Lecce
In July 2018 he moved to Lecce and gained promotion to Serie A in the 2018–19 Serie B season. He scored his first Serie A goal on 25 September 2019 against SPAL.

Vicenza
On 16 July 2021, he joined Vicenza on a one-year contract with an option to extend.

Cesena
On 25 January 2022, he signed a contract with Cesena until the end of the 2023–24 season.

International career
He was selected to 2009 Mediterranean Games and 2009 FIFA U-20 World Cup along with team-mate Francesco Bini.

References

External links
Profile at Football.it 
Profile at Piacenza 
FIGC 

1989 births
Living people
People from Latisana
Footballers from Friuli Venezia Giulia
Italian footballers
Italy youth international footballers
Piacenza Calcio 1919 players
Palermo F.C. players
F.C. Grosseto S.S.D. players
S.S.C. Bari players
Latina Calcio 1932 players
U.S. Lecce players
Novara F.C. players
L.R. Vicenza players
Cesena F.C. players
Serie A players
Serie B players
Serie C players
Association football defenders
Mediterranean Games silver medalists for Italy
Mediterranean Games medalists in football
Competitors at the 2009 Mediterranean Games